Fredrick Oduya Oprong (1936 – May 25, 2019) was a former Kenyan legislator and assistant minister who was awarded the Head of State’s Commendation (HSC- Civilian Division) for his contribution towards national development.

Biography  
Oprong was among politicians who joined Jaramogi Oginga Odinga to press for the release of Mzee Jomo Kenyatta and others from detention before independence. At the independence elections, he was elected MP for the then Busia North Constituency. As a pre-independence trade unionist, Mr Oprong had founded the Kenya Quarry and Mines Workers Union, hence Kenyatta appointed him assistant minister for Labour. He later lost his parliamentary seat, only to recapture it in 1992.

In 1993, Oduya Oprong, who was MP for Amagoro Constituency and assistant minister for Economic Planning and National Development, nearly lost his life when he was shot by unknown gunmen. He was rushed to Nairobi Hospital, then transferred to London accompanied by a nurse provided by President Daniel arap Moi and thereafter to a hospital in New York where he regained consciousness after three months.

He never fully recovered from the attack and still lived with a shrapnel in his head following doctors' advice that complete removal could cause death.

References

External links
Property Kenya
Nation Audio
KRA 
Former assistant minister Oduya Oprong dies at KNH

1936 births
2019 deaths
Members of the National Assembly (Kenya)
Kenyan victims of crime